Jorge Troiteiro Carrasco (born 9 April 1984) is a Spanish professional footballer who plays for CD Calamonte as an attacking midfielder.

Football career
Born in Almansa, Albacete, Castile-La Mancha, to fellow footballer Luis, Troiteiro emigrated at the age of two months to Mérida, Extremadura. Representing CP Mérida, he caught the eye of FC Barcelona at the age of 12 and attended the La Masia academy for five years, where he bunked with fellow Manchego Andrés Iniesta.

Already having a release clause of 350 million pesetas, Troiteiro left Barcelona for Atlético Madrid, making his senior debut in a couple of matches for the latter's C-team in Tercera División. At the end of his 18-month spell, he went back to his adopted home and joined Mérida UD in 2003. He never played any higher than Segunda División B, where he made 223 appearances and scored 21 goals for eight clubs, suffering four relegations including three in consecutive seasons. Abroad, he played for Doxa Katokopias FC and Enosis Neon Paralimni FC in Cyprus; the former was his career's only professional output, in the 2012–13 First Division.

References

External links

1984 births
Living people
People from Almansa
Sportspeople from the Province of Albacete
Spanish footballers
Footballers from Castilla–La Mancha
Association football midfielders
Segunda División B players
Tercera División players
Atlético Madrid C players
Mérida UD footballers
CD Linares players
UD Melilla footballers
Lucena CF players
CF Villanovense players
Extremadura UD footballers
Burgos CF footballers
Mérida AD players
Cypriot First Division players
Cypriot Second Division players
Doxa Katokopias FC players
Enosis Neon Paralimni FC players
Spanish expatriate footballers
Expatriate footballers in Cyprus
Spanish expatriate sportspeople in Cyprus